Orešje is a settlement east of Šmarjeta in the Municipality of Šmarješke Toplice in southeastern Slovenia. The area is part of the historical region of Lower Carniola. The municipality is now included in the Southeast Slovenia Statistical Region.

References

External links
Orešje at Geopedia

Populated places in the Municipality of Šmarješke Toplice